Kathleen Hoelzel (born March 31, 1943) is an American politician in the state of New Hampshire. She is a member of the New Hampshire House of Representatives, sitting as a Republican from the Rockingham 3 district (Raymond), having been first elected in 2008. She previously served from 1988–1992.

References

Living people
1943 births
Women state legislators in New Hampshire
Republican Party members of the New Hampshire House of Representatives
21st-century American women politicians
20th-century American women politicians
21st-century American politicians
20th-century American politicians